In the mathematical field of graph theory, a star coloring of a graph  is a (proper) vertex coloring in which every path on four vertices uses at least three distinct colors. Equivalently, in a star coloring, the induced subgraphs formed by the vertices of any two colors has connected components that are star graphs.

One generalization of star coloring is the closely related concept of acyclic coloring, where it is required that every cycle uses at least three colors, so the two-color induced subgraphs are forests.

Complexity 
It was demonstrated by  that it is NP-complete to determine whether , even when G is a graph that is both planar and bipartite.
 showed that finding an optimal star coloring is NP-hard even when G is a bipartite graph.

References 
.
.
.
.
 .
 .

External links 
 Star colorings and acyclic colorings (1973), present at the Research Experiences for Graduate Students (REGS) at the University of Illinois, 2008.

Graph coloring